Vanitha is an Indian magazine published fortnightly by the Malayala Manorama group. It is the largest magazine in India by circulation according to Audit Bureau of Circulations, with average qualifying sales of 687,915 copies (as of December 2013). It continues to be the largest in circulation in 2017 as well.

History and profile
Vanitha was launched in 1975 as a monthly, but turned into a fortnightly in 1987. The magazine was founded by Annamma Mathew, wife of K.M. Mathew, a woman who has contributed immensely in the fields of social service, cookery, journalism and literature. Vanitha is published in Malayalam and launched a Hindi edition in 1997. Although its name translates to "woman" in Sanskrit, it includes news,views and other articles on a variety of topics, and is not strictly a women's magazine.

Vanitha is owned and published by MM Publications Ltd. from Kottayam. MM Publications Ltd. is part of Malayala Manorama Group. In addition to being released twice a month, Vanitha also includes special double issues for Onam, Easter, New Year's Day and Christmas.

Between July and December 2000 Vanitha was the best-selling magazine in India with a circulation of 3,82,027 copies. In 2012, the Malayalam edition of the magazine had a readership of over of 2.27 million, making it the highest read magazine in India.

See also
 Malayala Manorama

References

1975 establishments in Kerala
Biweekly magazines published in India
Women's magazines published in India
Magazines established in 1975
Malayalam-language magazines
Malayala Manorama group
Mass media in Kerala
Women in Kerala
Indian news websites